The Union nationale des associations de défense des familles et de l'individu (UNADFI) is a French anti-cult association founded in 1974, recognized as a public utility association by a decree of 30 April 1996, and directly subsidized by the French state. It gathers and coordinates the Associations de Défense des Familles et de l'Individu (ADFI), whose purpose is to acquire information on the cult phenomenon with prevention and assistance for its victims.

In 1992, Janine Tavernier was the president of the association. But, in 2001 she resigned and began to criticize it. She was first replaced by Bernard Le Heritte, then in 2004 by Socialist deputy Catherine Picard. As of 31 December 2004, UNADFI was composed of 26 ADFI associations and totaled 1,520 member families. The association is currently member of the Union nationale des associations familiales (UNAF), as well as the FECRIS, an international anti-cult organization.

The association is sponsored by various ministries, including the Ministry of Youth Affairs and Sports and by social affairs, as well as by various communes and departments totaling 450,000 euros in 2002, over 80% of its budget.

The association publishes a magazine named BULLES (Bulletin de liaison pour l'étude des sectes), which criticizes many groups, including those which were listed in the 1995 Parliamentary Commission on Cults in France report, and many others (The Church of Jesus Christ of Latter-day Saints, Community of the Beatitudes).

Criticism

The UNADFI as well as associated groups has been criticized by psychologists and religious specialists as well as from targeted groups. Associations created to defend new religious movements such as the CAP LC (Coordination des associations de particuliers pour la liberté de conscience) and the CICNS (Le Centre d'information et de conseil des nouvelles spiritualités) publish testimonies of the victims of the ADFI member groups.

Criticism of ideological bias

The association has been criticized of defending conservative values and favoring Catholicism, to which the majority of the member organizations belong.

The sociologist Bruno Étienne notes that "the only beneficiary is a system which is clearly ideologically positioned". He believes that "The concepts of 'family' and 'of the individual' are not any more neutral than the notion of brainwashing".

Historian of religion Anne Morelli estimated in 1997 that the methods of anti-cult groups are "the same everywhere: to discredit all the religious groups outside of the large classic religions and to seed disinformation about them. The 'cult of the anti-cult' squeezes the media and politics in particular, but doesn't neglect the university research sector either. In France two associations share this 'market', corresponding to the two fundamental options in French society: one is secular (the CCMM), and the other is catholic (The UNADFI)".

Since her resignation from the movement in 2002, Janine Tavernier, president from 1993 to 2002, has leveled the same kind of criticisms towards her former employer. 

Tavernier explains that she resigned because a "witch hunt" had taken place.

Associations critical of the UNADFI reproach the association of involving itself in divorce proceedings, where an abusive use of the word "cult" would result in winning guardianship over children. and that it had intervened in certain matters where its information had proved false.

References

External links
 Union nationale des associations de défense des familles et de l'individu

Organizations established in 1974
French anti-cult organizations and individuals
Government opposition to new religious movements
Political repression in France
Anti-cult organizations